The Nashoba Valley refers to an area in Northwestern Middlesex and Northeastern Worcester Counties, Massachusetts, located around the interchange of Interstate 495 and Massachusetts Route 2.

At one point, Littleton, Massachusetts, was known as the Praying Indian town of Nashoba. The hill that today is Nashoba Valley Ski Area is called Nashoba Hill.

Towns 

There is no precise definition, but the following towns generally consider themselves in the Nashoba Valley:

 Acton
 Ayer
 Bolton
 Boxborough
 Fort Devens
 Dunstable
 Groton
 Harvard
 Lancaster
 Littleton
 Pepperell
 Shirley
 Stow
 Townsend
 Westford

Notable usages of Nashoba 
 Nashoba Publishing, Devens
 Nashoba Regional High School, Bolton
 Nashoba Valley Medical Center, Ayer
 Nashoba Valley Ski Area, Westford, Littleton
 Nashoba Valley Technical High School, Westford
Nashoba Valley Winery, Bolton

Geography of Middlesex County, Massachusetts
Geography of Worcester County, Massachusetts
Regions of Massachusetts